Thornton, Mississippi is an unincorporated community located in Holmes County, near the Yazoo River.

History
Thornton was incorporated in 1883 and named for Dr. C. C. Thornton, a local landowner.

Thornton is located on the Canadian National Railway.

A post office first began operation under the name Thornton in 1883.

Notable people
 Bob Quick, former professional basketball player
 Clarence Pierce, member of the Mississippi House of Representatives from 1952 to 1984

In popular culture
In the 1988 film, Mississippi Burning, FBI Agent Anderson (played by Gene Hackman) says he is from Thornton, though he erroneously identifies it as being a very short distance from Memphis, Tennessee.

References

Unincorporated communities in Holmes County, Mississippi
Unincorporated communities in Mississippi